Abdoulaye Loum (born 3 April 1991) is a French professional basketball player who plays for French LNB Pro A club JDA Dijon. After averaging 4.9 points per game during the 2019-20 season, he was re-signed with the club on 25 May 2020.

References

1991 births
Living people
BCM Gravelines players
Élan Chalon players
French men's basketball players
JDA Dijon Basket players
Orléans Loiret Basket players
People from Mont-de-Marsan
Power forwards (basketball)
SOMB Boulogne-sur-Mer players
Sportspeople from Landes (department)
STB Le Havre players